In the C++ programming language,  and  are a pair of language constructs that perform dynamic memory allocation, object construction and object destruction.

Overview
Except for a form called the "placement new", the  operator denotes a request for memory allocation on a process's heap. If sufficient memory is available,  initialises the memory, calling object constructors if necessary, and returns the address to the newly allocated and initialised memory. A  request, in its simplest form, looks as follows:

p = new T;

where  is a previously declared pointer of type  (or some other type to which a  pointer can be assigned, such as a superclass of ).

If not enough memory is available in the free store for an object of type , the  request indicates failure by throwing an exception of type . This removes the need to explicitly check the result of an allocation.

 syntax has several variants that allow finer control over memory allocation and object construction. A function call-like syntax is used to call a different constructor than the default one and pass it arguments, e.g.,

p = new T(argument);

calls a single-argument  constructor instead of the default constructor when initializing the newly allocated buffer.

A different variant allocates and initialises  arrays of objects rather than single objects:
p = new T [N];

This requests a memory buffer from the free store that is large enough to hold a contiguous array of  objects of type , and calls the default constructor on each element of the array.

Using the inappropriate form results in undefined behavior. C++ compilers are not required to generate a diagnostic message for using the wrong form.

The C++11 standard specifies an additional syntax,

p = new T[N] {initializer1, ..., initializerN};

Error handling
If  cannot find sufficient memory to service an allocation request, it can report its error in three distinct ways. The  may attempt to make more memory available, or terminate the program if it can't.

If no  is installed,  instead throws an exception of type . Thus, the program does not need to check the value of the returned pointer, as is the habit in C; if no exception was thrown, the allocation succeeded.

The third method of error handling is provided by the variant form , which specifies that no exception should be thrown; instead, a null pointer is returned to signal an allocation error.

Overloading
The  operator can be overloaded so that specific types (classes) use custom memory allocation algorithms for their instances. For example, the following is a variant of the singleton pattern where the first  call allocates an instance and all subsequent calls return this same instance:

#include <cstdlib>
#include <cstddef>

class Singleton {
public:
  static void* operator new(std::size_t size) {
    if (!instance) {
      instance = std::malloc(size);
    }
    refcount++;
    return instance;
  }

  static void operator delete(void*) noexcept {
    if (--refcount == 0) {
      std::free(instance);
      instance = nullptr;
    }
  }

private:
  static void* instance = nullptr;
  static std::size_t refcount = 0;
};

This feature was available from early on in C++'s history, although the specific overloading mechanism changed. Stroustrup reported that in early applications, the C function  was "the most common performance bottleneck in real systems", with programs spending up to 50% of their time in this function.

.

Relation to malloc and free

The C++ standard library instead provides a dynamic array (collection) that can be extended or reduced in its  template class.

Mixing the two families of operations, e.g., 'ing 'ly allocated memory or 'ing 'd memory, causes undefined behavior and in practice can lead to various catastrophic results such as failure to release locks and thus deadlock.

See also
 Allocator (C++)
 Exception handling
 Memory pool
 Pointer (computer programming)
 Resource Acquisition Is Initialization (RAII)
 Smart pointers

References

C++
Articles with example C++ code